Erik Myers (February 29, 1980 – February 25, 2021) was an American comedian, actor, and writer.

Early life 
Myers was born in February 1980. He grew up in Columbia, Maryland, and began his comedy career at the age of 18 at Winchester's Pub in Baltimore. In 2005 he won the "Funniest Person in Baltimore" contest. Myers later moved to Florida where he was named 2011 Florida's Funniest Comedian.

Career 
Myers was based in Los Angeles, California, where he was a paid regular at The Comedy Store in Hollywood. He has appeared on Gotham City Live, Laughs on the Fox Network, and performed his 1-hour special Dopeless Romantic for Hulu. He has appeared on Andrew Dice Clay Presents The Blue Show on Showtime, and Comics Unleashed with Byron Allen. Myers was the co-creator of the animated cartoon Court Ordered, loosely based on his life with characters voiced by many fellow notable comedians.

Death 
Erik Myers died on February 24, 2021, five days before his 41st birthday, after being struck by a van near Amarillo, Texas.

References

External links
 
 

1980 births
2021 deaths
American male comedians
American stand-up comedians
Place of birth missing
Comedians from Maryland
People from Columbia, Maryland
Road incident deaths in Texas
Towson University alumni